3Teeth (stylized as 3TEETH or 3T3ETH) is an American industrial metal band from Los Angeles, California. Formed in 2013, the band currently consists of Alexis Mincolla (vocals), Chase Brawner (guitars), Xavier Swafford (keys & synth), Andrew Means (modular synth & bass), and Nick Rossi (drums). They have currently released three studio albums: their self-titled debut in 2014, <shutdown.exe> in 2017, and Metawar on July 5, 2019, via Century Media Records.

History

Name and formation
The group initially formed as a fun passion-project between Mincolla and Swafford, who lived down the street from each other in Los Angeles. Mincolla did not have a musical background but had experience in visual arts and promotion. Mincolla and Swafford met at a weekly party called Lil Death, which was hosted by Mincolla, where they began discussing some ideas for a multi-media mix of visuals and music. The two soon met Andrew Means after being impressed by an online video he sent the pair which Mincolla described as looking "like a computer virus."

After some of their music was hosted online and began to gain traction, the three sought out a guitarist for the project. Guitar work had initially been outsourced but the turnaround time was slow. Means had grown up with Brawner and suggested that the trio audition him, and after a successful audition Chase joined and 3Teeth had officially formed.

The band took the name 3Teeth from the concepts of Odontomancy, which Mincolla described as an ancient form of divination where "the seer would read prophecies in the teeth like rune stones." as well as the word trident, which comes from Latin for "three teeth." Mincolla said of the trident: "...this divine weapon of God that brings destruction. It's what Marduk killed Tiamat with -- this caught thunderbolt or trident."

The original line-up consisted of Mincolla, Brawner, Swafford, and Means, with Andrew Means performing live drums on an electric kit. Andrew Melendez joined as a live drummer the spring and summer tours in 2017 before Justin Hanson joined the group in the fall of 2017. The band signed to Century Media Records in April 2018 with Hanson being announced as the official fifth member of the band. Nick Rossi joined the live band in Fall 2019 as a temporary replacement for Hanson, who had injured his foot on the European tour earlier that year. In June 2020, the band announced that they had mutually parted ways with Hanson and that Rossi would be joining them as the new drummer to commence recording on the band's fourth album.

Studio albums and other releases 
Their self-titled debut album was released in 2014 and reached the number eight spot on iTunes Electronic Music Chart. A remix album titled Remixed followed in October 2014, featuring remixes by other prominent industrial artists such as KANGA and Aesthetic Perfection.

Their sophomore album, <shutdown.exe>, was released on May 19, 2017. The album was mixed by Sean Beavan, who is best known for working with other prominent industrial artists Nine Inch Nails and Marilyn Manson. The album reached No. 23 on Billboard the following month. In February 2018, the band released the first of two collaboration tracks, "Light's Out", with hip-hop/punk artists Ho99o9. A second track, "Time's Up", was released in March 2018, and both tracks were later released on a limited edition 7" vinyl following a co-headlining tour titled Lights Out North America.

The band began working on their third album in early 2018, with Sean Beavan returning to mix and produce. The album was completed on December 22.

The title for the third album, Metawar, was announced on April 5, 2019, alongside the release of the debut single "American Landfill". The music video for American Landfill debuted on April 15, 2019. The video was directed by Matthew Santoro, longtime-friend of Alexis Mincolla and Hollywood director and visual effects artist whose credits include X-Men Origins: Wolverine and 300.

The second single for Metawar, "EXXXIT", was released on April 23, 2019, alongside a music video and a North American tour announcement with Author & Punisher and GOST as support. The third single, "Affluenza", was released on May 31, 2019, alongside an official lyric music video. The fourth single, "President X", was released on June 14, 2019. The single was accompanied by a music video featuring Mincolla as a neo-fascist lizard-man president in "band's most outwardly political song to date." The fifth single released was the band's cover of "Pumped Up Kicks" by Foster the People which was released on June 28, 2019.  A music video featuring a SWAT raid and firearms footage was released alongside the cover.

Metawar was released worldwide on July 5, 2019. Frontman Mincolla described the album as centering on "the idea of world vs world, and the notion that if man doesn't create his own world then he's often crushed by the world of another." 

On January 17, 2020, "ALTÆR" was released as the sixth single from Metawar. It was released along with a music video which featured footage captured at their performance at 2019's Wasteland Weekend.

While touring in support of Metawar in 2019, the band recorded one original track and two cover songs for the film Guns Akimbo. Their cover of "You Spin Me Round (Like a Record)" by Dead or Alive was featured in the film's trailer,   and it was later announced that the second cover song would be "The Ballroom Blitz" originally recorded by The Sweet.

Following its release, Metawar became the band's most commercially successful album, debuting at No. 23 on Billboard and at No. 28 on the iTunes Top Albums chart as well as the No. 1 album on the iTunes Metal charts. The album also debuted at No. 82 on Billboards Top Album Sales chart for the week of July 20, 2019, and at No. 3 on Billboards Heatseekers Albums for the same week. With the release of Metawar, 3Teeth themselves charted at No. 25 on Billboards Emerging Artists chart.

On August 6, 2021, the band released a song titled "Paralyze" featuring punk rap group Ho99o9. The song was produced by Mick Gordon.

Live performances  

3Teeth are known for their use of menacing visuals during live performances. The band was hand-selected by Tool to be their supporting act on their 2016 North American tour. The group opened for German band Rammstein for some of their U.S. dates in the summer of 2017 and ended the year performing with Danzig and HIM. 3Teeth were selected by Rammstein to open for them on their special New Year's Eve performances in Mexico in December 2018 / January 2019. The band spent much of 2019 touring in support of Metawar, including a European tour as support for Ministry and a headlining North American tour alongside GOST and Author & Punisher before closing the year in support of Ghostemane for select dates. 

3Teeth resumed touring in February 2020, kicking off another European headlining tour with industrial icon Pig as support for UK shows. A 2020 North American co-headlining tour with Carnifex was announced soon after along with the announcements that 3Teeth would play multiple festival dates throughout the year, including Welcome to Rockville and Hellfest. The COVID-19 pandemic forced the band to cancel the remainder of their 2020 shows two days before the Meta-X Tour with Carnifex was slated to commence, however.

Musical styles and influences
3Teeth's musical style has been described as industrial, industrial metal, industrial rock, alternative metal, electronic rock, electro-industrial, nu metal, heavy metal, and EBM. 3Teeth's music heavily features sequenced beats, down-tuned guitars, samples, and synthetic melodies. The band has been compared to bands/artists such as Ministry, Skinny Puppy, Nine Inch Nails, Marilyn Manson, KMFDM, Bile, Dope, Rob Zombie, Rammstein, and Tool.

Lead vocalist, Alexis Mincolla, listens to bands like Sepultura, Pantera, White Zombie, and Nine Inch Nails. He cites The Downward Spiral by Nine Inch Nails as a huge influence for 3Teeth's music.

Band membersCurrent members Alexis Mincolla – vocals (2013–present)
 Xavier Swafford – keyboards, synthesizers (2013–present)
 Andrew Means – bass, modular synthesizer (2017–present), drums (2013–2017)
 Chase Brawner – guitars (2013–present)
 Nick Rossi – drums (2020–present)Former members'''
 Andrew Melendez – drums (2017)
 Justin Hanson – drums (2017–2020)

Discography
Studio albums
 3Teeth (2014)
 <shutdown.exe> (2017)
 Metawar (2019)

Other releases
 REMIXED (2014) - remix album for the self-titled debut
 "Lights Out" / "Time's Up" (2018) - limited 7" vinyl with Ho99o9
 Guns Akimbo'' ("You Spin Me Round (Like a Record)" / "Ballroom Blitz") (2021) - limited 7" vinyl

References

Other sources

External links

3teeth.org

Century Media Records
Storming the Base 
Artoffact Records 

American industrial metal musical groups
Cyberpunk music
American electronic rock musical groups
Musical groups from Los Angeles
Musical quintets
Nu metal musical groups from California
Electronic music groups from California